Jenna Marie Massoli (born April 9, 1974), known professionally as Jenna Jameson, is an American model, former pornographic film actress, businesswoman, and television personality. She has been named the world's most famous adult entertainment performer and "The Queen of Porn".

She started acting in erotic videos in 1993 after having worked as a stripper and glamour model. By 1996, she had won the "Top Newcomer" award from each of the three major adult movie organizations. She has since won more than 35 adult-video awards, and has been inducted into the X-Rated Critics Organization (XRCO) and Adult Video News (AVN) Halls of Fame.

Jameson founded the adult-entertainment company ClubJenna in 2000 with Jay Grdina, whom she later married and divorced. Initially, a single website, this business expanded into managing similar websites of other stars and began producing sexually explicit videos in 2001. The first such movie, Briana Loves Jenna (with Briana Banks), was named at the 2003 AVN Awards as the best-selling and best-renting pornographic title for 2002. By 2005, ClubJenna had revenues of US$30 million with profits estimated at half that.

Jameson has also crossed over into mainstream pop culture, starting with a minor role in Howard Stern's 1997 film Private Parts. Her mainstream appearances continued with several guest-hosting and guest-starring on various television programs. Playboy TV hosted her Jenna's American Sex Star reality show, in which aspiring porn stars competed for a ClubJenna contract. Her 2004 autobiography, How to Make Love Like a Porn Star: A Cautionary Tale, spent six weeks on The New York Times Best Seller list.

Jameson announced her retirement from pornography at the 2008 AVN Awards, stating that she would never return to the industry. Although she no longer performs in pornographic films, she began working as a webcam model in 2013.

Early life 
Jenna Marie Massoli was born on April 9, 1974, in Las Vegas, Nevada. Her father, Laurence Henry Massoli, was a police officer at the Las Vegas Sheriff's Department and program director for KSNV-DT. Her mother, Judith Brooke Hunt, was a Las Vegas showgirl who danced in the Folies Bergère show at the Tropicana Resort & Casino. Her mother died of melanoma on February 20, 1976, two months before her daughter's second birthday. The cancer treatments bankrupted the family and they relocated in Nevada, Arizona and Montana, usually living in a trailer home or with her paternal grandmother. She and her older brother Tony were raised Catholic, though they were essentially left to parent each other.

Jameson was a frequent entrant in beauty pageants as a child and enrolled in ballet classes throughout her childhood. In a featurette on the Zombie Strippers DVD, Jameson indicates she trained in dance for fifteen years.

Jameson wrote in her autobiography that in October 1990, when she was 16 years old and while the family was living on a cattle ranch in Fromberg, Montana, she was beaten with rocks and gang raped by four boys after a football game at Fromberg High School. The incident began after she attempted to hitchhike home and that she entered the car of the four boys while believing that she would be driven to her home. She reported being raped a second time while still 16 by "Preacher", her boyfriend Jack's biker uncle. Preacher has denied the rape ever occurred. Rather than tell her father, she left home and moved in with Jack in her first serious relationship.

Jack was a tattoo artist and gave her the first of a series of tattoos, one of which would become her trademark tattoo, two hearts on her right buttock. According to E!, her brother Tony, who later owned a tattoo parlor himself, added the inscription "Heart Breaker".

Career

Early 
She was hired at Disneyland Resort, but she left after two months, stating concerns over the schedule and salary.

Her boyfriend Jack encouraged her to apply for jobs as a dancer, and in 1991, though underage, she began dancing in Las Vegas strip clubs using a fake identification. After she was rejected from the Crazy Horse Too strip club because of her braces, she removed them with pliers and was accepted. After six months, she was earning US$2,000 per night, before graduating from Bonanza High School.

Her first stage name as a dancer was "Jennasis", which she later used as the name of a business that she incorporated ("Jennasis Killing Co.").  As for picking her permanent professional name, she said, "I had to come up with a good name.  I didn't want a porno name.  So I sat down, opened up the phone book and thumbed to the J's, cause I wanted it to match my first name."  She saw 'James', but rejected "Jenna James" because it "sounds too porno".  Right under that was 'Jameson' which struck her as being the name of the whiskey she likes and thought "Ok, that's perfect."  That night at work she saw her brother and asked him what he thought of the name "Jenna Jameson".  He said, "I'm drinking Jameson right now."  And the name stuck after that.

Besides dancing, starting later in 1991, she posed for nude photographs for photographer Suze Randall in Los Angeles, with the intention of getting into Penthouse. After her photos had appeared in several men's magazines under various names, she then stopped working for Randall, feeling Randall was "a shark".

While in high school, she began taking drugs – cocaine, LSD, and methamphetamine – accompanied by her brother (who was addicted to heroin) and at times her father. Her addiction worsened during her four years with her boyfriend. She eventually stopped eating properly and became too thin to model; Jack left her in 1994. She weighed  when a friend put her in a wheelchair and sent her to her father, who was then living in Redding, California, in order to detox; her father did not recognize her when she got off the plane.

Pornographic film 

Jameson says that she started acting in sex videos in retaliation for the infidelity of her boyfriend, Jack. She first appeared in an erotic film in 1993, a non-explicit softcore movie by Andrew Blake, with girlfriend Nikki Tyler. Her first pornographic movie scenes were filmed by Randy West and appeared in 1994's Up and Cummers 10 and Up and Cummers 11. She quickly achieved notice and appeared in several other pornographic films while still living in Las Vegas.

Of her first adult movie, Randy West said "Jenna contacted me and said she wanted to get into the XXX business, but her agent didn't want her to do porn. A month later I'm on a shoot in Woodland Hills (a San Fernando Valley section of Los Angeles), and there's Jenna. She said she wanted to get into the business, despite what her agent said. I told her if you want to just do a girl/girl scene, we can do that. She said she wanted to work with Kylie Ireland, so I set it up. When the sex started, she just fucking rocked! I knew Jenna was special right off the bat. I figured she'd be the next Ginger Lynn, but nobody had any idea she was going to be as big as she turned out to be. Jenna told me when we first met that she was going to be a star."

Jameson got her first breast implants on July 28, 1994, to enhance her stripping and movie careers. By 2004, she had had two different sets of breast implants and a chin implant.

Jameson's first adult video appearances were lesbian scenes (a common way that female performers ease into the business). She says: "Girl-on-girl was easy and natural. Then they offered me lots of money to do boy-girl." Her first heterosexual scene was in Up and Cummers 11 (1994). At the beginning of her career, she promised herself that she would never do anal sex or double penetration scenes on film. Instead, her "signature move" was oral sex, lubricated with saliva. She has also never done any interracial sex scenes with men (despite that category's runaway popularity during the 2000s). When asked about this on The Howard Stern Show on February 8, 2008, she said that she was not necessarily opposed to doing so; rather, "it never really came up", as there were few black men working in porn when she started, and none of them worked [exclusively] for the same company [as] she did.

In 1994, after overcoming her drug addiction by spending several weeks with her father and grandmother, Jameson relocated to Los Angeles to live with Nikki Tyler. Her first movie after that was Silk Stockings. Later in 1995, Wicked Pictures, a then small pornographic film production company, signed her to an exclusive contract. She remembers telling Wicked Pictures founder Steve Orenstein: "The most important thing to me right now is to become the biggest star the industry has ever seen."

The contract earned Jameson US$6,000 for each of eight movies in her first year. Her first big-budget production was Blue Movie (1995), where she played a reporter investigating a porn set; it won multiple AVN Awards. In 1996, Jameson won top awards from three major industry organizations, the XRCO Best New Starlet award, the AVN Best New Starlet Award, and the Fans of X-Rated Entertainment (F.O.X.E.) Video Vixen award. She was the first entertainer to win all three awards. A stream of other awards followed.

By 2001, Jameson earned $60,000 for a day and a half of filming a single DVD, and $8,000 per night dancing at strip clubs. She tried to restrict herself to five films per year and two weeks of dancing per month. Her husband Jay Grdina has said that she earned as much as $25,000 per night dancing.

Between 2005 and 2006, she hosted Playboy TV's Jenna's American Sex Star, where prospective porn stars compete in sexual performances for a contract with her company, ClubJenna. Winners of the contracts for the first two years were Brea Bennett and Roxy Jezel.

In August 2007, Jameson had her breast implants removed, reducing her from a D to a C cup; she also said she was finished with appearing on camera in pornographic films, though she would continue running ClubJenna, which was grossing $30 million per year. In January 2008, Jameson confirmed she was retiring from pornographic performances and has since said that she "won't even do a Maxim cover".

Jameson's first appearance at an adult-entertainment event since her retirement was at the 2013 Exxxotica New Jersey convention in October. The following month, she returned to the adult industry as a webcam model. On January 15, 2014, Fleshlight released Jameson's signature artificial vagina. Jameson was also the master of ceremonies for the 2014 XBIZ Awards on January 24.

Business ventures 
Jameson and Grdina formed ClubJenna as an Internet pornography company in 2000. ClubJenna.com was one of the first pornographic sites to provide more than pictures and videos; it provided explicit diaries, relationship advice, and even stock tips to paid members. The site reportedly was profitable in its third week. The business later diversified into multimedia pornographic entertainment, first by administering other porn stars' websites, then, in 2001, by the production of pornographic films.

Early ClubJenna films starred Jameson herself, limiting herself to on-screen sex with other women or with Grdina, who appeared as Justin Sterling. The first ClubJenna film, Briana Loves Jenna (2001), co-produced with Vivid, cost US$280,000 to make, and grossed over $1 million in its first year. It was the best selling and best-renting pornographic title of its year, winning twin AVN Awards. It was marketed as "Jenna. Her first boy/girl scene in over 2 years." referring to Jameson's abstention from heterosexual on-film intercourse. Grdina has said that Jameson's films averaged sales of 100,000 copies, compared with run-of-the-mill pornographic films, which did well to sell 5,000. On the other hand, he also said that their films took up to twelve days to film, compared with one day for other pornographic films.

In a January 2009 interview with William Shatner on Shatner's Raw Nerve, Jameson said she came close to buying Penthouse magazine when publisher Bob Guccione filed for Chapter 11 reorganization of his business (which occurred in August 2003), but was thwarted when someone else swooped in and bought up all the stock. New York Magazine'''s Intelligencer quoted a source from Penthouse as saying "I'm sure she is considering it", adding that Jameson was to be cover girl in January 2004 – and "it's a really wild-looking shoot, even for a porn star."

In 2004, the ClubJenna films expanded to starring other actresses without Jameson – Krystal Steal, Jesse Capelli, McKenzie Lee, Ashton Moore and Sophia Rossi – as Jameson stepped back from starring roles. In 2005 Jameson first directed a film, The Provocateur, released as Jenna's Provocateur in September 2006. The ClubJenna films were distributed and marketed by Vivid Entertainment, which Forbes magazine once called "the world's largest adult film company". They made up a third of ClubJenna's revenues, but over half of the profits.

ClubJenna was run as a family business, with Grdina's sister, Kris, as vice president in charge of merchandising. In 2005, ClubJenna had estimated revenues of $30 million, with profits of about half that.

Jameson also capitalized on merchandising herself. The first advertisement displayed her wearing only a thong and read "Who Says They Cleaned Up Times Square?" There is a line of sex toys licensed to Doc Johnson, and an "anatomically correct" Jenna Jameson action figure. She stars in her own sex simulation video game, Virtually Jenna, in which the goal is to bring a 3D model of her to orgasm. Y-Tell, ClubJenna's wireless company, sells Jenna Jameson "moan tones" (telephone ringtones), chat services, and games in partnerships with 20 carriers around the world, mostly in Europe and South America. In 2006, New York City-based Wicked Cow Entertainment started to expand her brand to barware, perfume, handbags, lingerie, and footwear, sold through high end retailers such as Saks Fifth Avenue and Colette boutiques. Her film and merchandising success enabled her to attain her goal of becoming the top porn star in the world.

In August 2005, ClubJenna launched Club Thrust, an interactive website for Jameson's gay male fans, which includes videos, galleries, sex advice, gossip, and downloads. The director of webmaster relations for ClubJenna said the straight site had always had a lot of gay traffic. By 2006, ClubJenna administered more than 150 official sites for other adult entertainment industry stars.

In August 2005, a group of business investors that included Jameson purchased Babes Cabaret, a strip club in Scottsdale, Arizona, intending to make it the first foray of ClubJenna into live entertainment. Soon after the purchase attracted attention, the Scottsdale City Council proposed a new ordinance banning nudity at adult-entertainment venues and requiring a four-foot divider restricting contact with dancers. Such a divider would have also effectively banned lap dances, the dancers' main source of revenue. Jameson argued strongly against the ordinance, and helped organize a petition against it. On September 12, 2006, in a referendum on the ordinance, voters struck down the stricter rules, allowing the club to continue to operate as before.

On February 3, 2006, Jameson hosted a "Vivid ClubJenna Super Bowl Party" with several other ClubJenna and Vivid Girls at the Zoo Club in Detroit, Michigan for a $500 to $1,000 ticket price. It featured a lingerie show, but no planned nudity or sex acts. When first announced, the party caused controversy with the National Football League, which did not sanction this as an official Super Bowl event. For 2007, Jameson signed up to play quarterback in the Lingerie Bowl, but retired due to her insurance company's damage concerns. She instead acted as commentator.

On June 22, 2006, Playboy Enterprises announced that it had bought ClubJenna Inc., along with an agreement to have both Jameson and Grdina stay on as contracted executives. Playboy CEO Christie Hefner said that she expected to rapidly increase film production, producing about thirty features in the first year, and will expand the way they are sold, not only as DVDs but through TV channels, video-on-demand services, and mobile phones. On November 1, 2006, Playboy renamed one of the Spice Network's pay-per-view channels from The Hot Network to ClubJenna.

 Books 

Jameson's autobiography, How to Make Love Like a Porn Star: A Cautionary Tale was published in 2004. It was co-written with Neil Strauss, a contributor to The New York Times and Rolling Stone, and published by ReganBooks, a division of HarperCollins. It was an instant bestseller, spending six weeks on The New York Times Best Seller list. The autobiography also won the 2004 "Mainstream's Adult Media Favorite" XRCO Award in a tie with Seymore Butts's Family Business TV series. It was translated into German as Pornostar. Die Autobiographie in November 2005, and Spanish as Cómo Hacer El Amor Igual Que Una Estrella Porno in January 2006.

The book covers her early career from her beginning in show business living with her tattoo artist boyfriend, through receiving the Pornographic Hot d'Or award at Cannes, and wedding pictures from her second marriage. It does not omit sordid details, describing her two rapes, drug addictions, an unhappy first marriage, and numerous affairs with men and women. The first-person narrative is broken up by personal photos, childhood diary entries, family interviews, movie scripts, and comic panels.

The autobiography publisher, Judith Regan, also served as executive producer of a tie-in television news special, Jenna Jameson's Confessions, airing on VH1 on August 16, 2004, one day before the book's launch. In April 2005, ReganBooks and Jameson filed lawsuits against each other. The point of contention was a proposed reality show about Jameson's everyday life, discussed between her then-husband, Jay Grdina, and the A&E Network. ReganBooks maintained that any A&E deal was a breach of Jameson's contract, which indicated that ReganBooks had a stake in the profits generated by both the special based on her memoir and a reality-based series, as well as "any similar projects". Jameson's suit claimed that the A&E deal preceded the ReganBooks contract. The reality series had still not materialized, and the lawsuit was still being discussed, when HarperCollins fired Judith Regan on December 15, 2006, over an unrelated issue.

In January 2007, Jameson was reported in talks with producers on turning the autobiography into a movie. In March 2007, Jameson was reportedly missing meetings with producers, thus endangering the movie, due to problems with a recent vaginoplasty.

In April 2013, Jameson announced she was working on a fictional erotic novel called Sugar. It was co-written with Hope Tarr and published by Skyhorse Publishing. It was released on October 21, 2013.

 Mainstream appearances 
Jameson is also known for achieving a high level of celebrity outside of pornography – even bringing pornography itself closer to mainstream society's awareness and acceptance. She has said: "I've always embraced my hard-core roots, but becoming a household name was an important thing to me."

In 1995, Jameson sent photos of herself to radio host Howard Stern. She became a regular guest on his show, appearing more than 30 times, and played the role of "Mandy", the "First Nude Woman on Radio", in Stern's semi-autobiographical 1997 film Private Parts. This film appearance was the beginning of a series of non-porn film and television roles. In 1997, Jameson made an appearance for an Extreme Championship Wrestling pay-per-view, Hardcore Heaven '97 as the valet for The Dudley Boyz; another appearance at ECW Living Dangerously on March 1, 1998; and a few months where she was ECW's on-screen interviewer. In 1998, she filmed a vignette with Val Venis, a character in the WWE, for airing on WWE programming. In the late 1990s, Jameson guest hosted several episodes of the E! cable network's hit travel/adventure/party show Wild On!, appearing scantily clad in tropical locations. Jameson was featured and interviewed on the British television show European Blue Review on Channel 5.

Jameson appeared in a 2001 music video for the Eminem song "Without Me". She can be seen in bed with Eminem as one of the "two trailer park girls" (the other one is fitness model Kiana Tom) that "go round the outside". Jameson voiced an animated version of herself in a July 2001 episode of Family Guy entitled "Brian Does Hollywood". Her character won an award for acting in a porn film directed by Brian Griffin, and at the close of the episode Peter Griffin kidnaps her. In 2002, Jameson and Ron Jeremy played themselves in Comedy Central's first feature television movie Porn 'n Chicken, in the roles of speakers for a pornography viewing club. Also in 2002, she appeared in two video games, most notably voicing Candy Suxxx in Grand Theft Auto: Vice City. Her character begins as a prostitute, but goes on to success as a pornographic actress and is displayed on several billboards within the game. Her performance won the 2003 G-Phoria "Best Live Action/Voice Performance Award – Female". She also provided both the appearance and the voice for "Daisy", a secret playable character for the video game Tony Hawk's Pro Skater 4, who performs provocative tricks with her clothing and skateboard. In 2003, Jameson appeared in two episodes of the NBC prime-time television show Mister Sterling as the girlfriend of a political financier.

In the months following the publication of her autobiography, she was interviewed on NBC, CNBC, Fox News, and CNN, and the book was reviewed by The New York Times, Reuters, and other major media outlets.

Jameson was featured prominently in Samhain, a low budget horror film in which she starred with other pornographic actresses including Ginger Lynn Allen. It was filmed in 2002 but had sat unreleased until 2005, when it was re-cut and released as Evil Breed: The Legend of Samhain. She had another minor horror film role in Sin-Jin Smyth, delayed from release until late 2006.

In February 2006, Comedy Central announced plans to feature Jameson as "P-Whip", in a starring role in its first animated mobile phone series, Samurai Love God. Mediaweek called her the biggest name attached to the project. In April 2006, Jameson was the star of a video podcast ad for Adidas, advertising Adicolor shoes by playing a provocative game of whack a mole. Jameson made an appearance in the U.S. reality TV show The Simple Life in the fifth-season episode "Committed", broadcast on July 1, 2007; Paris Hilton and Nicole Richie, while working in a "love camp", brought her in to help throw a "love ceremony" vow for the five dysfunctional couples. In 2008, Jameson had another starring role in the comedy horror film Zombie Strippers, loosely based on Eugène Ionesco's classic play Rhinoceros. Madame Tussauds has a wax model of Jameson.

On August 27, 2015, Jameson became a contestant on the sixteenth series of the UK reality series Celebrity Big Brother, representing the US. On September 22, she became the sixth housemate to be evicted on Day 27, just two days short from the final.

 Controversial mainstream appearances 
Some of her mainstream appearances sparked controversy. An interview with Jameson contained in the 1999 Abercrombie & Fitch A&F Quarterly was part of the motivation for Michigan Attorney General Jennifer Granholm and Illinois Lieutenant Governor Corinne Wood to speak out against the hybrid magazine-catalog. The campaign was joined by parents and Christian conservative groups, and Abercrombie removed it from shelves in 2003.

In November 2001, the Oxford Union debating society invited Jameson to come to Oxford to argue against the proposition "The House Believes that Porn is Harmful." She wrote in her diary at the time, "I feel like I am going to be out of my element, but, I could never pass this chance up ... it's a once in a lifetime thing." In the end, her side won the debate 204 to 27.

In February 2003, Pony International planned to feature her as one of several pornographic actors in advertisements for athletic shoes. This was attacked by Bill O'Reilly of Fox News in an editorial called "Using Quasi-Prostitutes to Sell Sneakers", calling pornographic actors inappropriate role models for teens. In response, The Harvard Crimson proposed a boycott of O'Reilly and Fox News. Jameson herself sent a sarcastic email to the show, writing:

 Awards 

 Personal life 

 Relationships and health 

In 2004 Jameson stated that she was bisexual, and that she had had sex with 100 women and 30 men off-screen in her life, but by 2008 she described herself as "totally hetero". She has stated the best relationship she ever had was her lesbian relationship with porn actress Nikki Tyler, which she documents in her autobiography. They lived together at the start of her porn career and again before her second marriage. Famous boyfriends discussed in her autobiography include Marilyn Manson and Tommy Lee.

On December 20, 1996, Jameson married porn star/Wicked Pictures director Brad Armstrong. The marriage lasted just 10 weeks. Although they informally separated in March 1997, she remained contractually obligated to work on Wicked Pictures projects involving both of them. They legally separated and divorced in March 2001, after Brad discovered her sexual affair with Jorge Araya Montoya (whom she met on a visit to Costa Rica).

Jameson met former pornographic studio owner Jay Grdina, scion of a wealthy cattle-ranching family, who had entered pornographic film production after college. From 1998 until Jameson's retirement, Grdina was Jameson's only on-screen male sex partner, acting under the name Justin Sterling. They were engaged in December 2000, well before her divorce from Armstrong, and married June 22, 2003. They tried to have children from mid-2004 onwards, as Jameson had planned to retire from adult entertainment upon becoming a mother. The couple resided in Scottsdale, Arizona, in a  Spanish-style mansion, bought for $2 million in 2002.

In November 2004, Jameson was diagnosed with skin cancer. Though surgery removed it, she miscarried shortly after the diagnosis. She was unable to conceive again with Grdina, even with in vitro fertilization. Jameson said the in vitro process "wasn't a good thing for me"; she gained weight and did not get pregnant. According to Jameson, the stresses of cancer plus infertility led to her marriage's collapse. In August 2006, Star magazine and TMZ.com confirmed with Jameson's publicist that she and Grdina had separated.

In October 2006, it was reported that Jameson began dating mixed martial artist and former UFC champion Tito Ortiz, whom she met on Myspace. Ortiz canceled a November 12, 2006 appearance as the guest of honor at the United States Marine Corps birthday ball at the Marine Corps Air Station Miramar in San Diego, when the Corps refused to let him bring Jameson as his guest. On November 30, 2006, in an interview on The Howard Stern Show, Ortiz stated that he was in love with Jameson, that she was no longer acting in pornography, and that they were in a monogamous relationship. On December 12, 2006, Jameson filed for divorce from Grdina. She introduced Ortiz and talked about their relationship at the 2008 AVN Adult Movie Awards while she was presenting an award. She also made brief appearances on two episodes of The Celebrity Apprentice'' to help Ortiz on the tasks assigned in those episodes.

Jameson announced in August 2008 that she and Ortiz were expecting twins in April 2009. On March 16, 2009, Jameson gave birth to twin boys, Jesse Jameson and Journey Jette. Jameson and Ortiz split up in March 2013. Ortiz was granted full custody of the twins.

Jameson's father, Laurence Henry Massoli, died on October 2, 2010, after suffering complications from triple bypass surgery.

As of 2014, Jameson has undergone extensive tattooing, almost completely covering both of her arms in sleeve tattoos.

On August 5, 2016, Jameson announced that she and her Israeli boyfriend, Lior Bitton, were expecting their first child together. On April 6, 2017, they welcomed a daughter, Batel Lu.

In June 2015, Jameson announced that she was converting to Judaism, in order to marry Bitton. She was raised Catholic. In October of that year, Israel's Channel 2 announced a reality television series documenting Jameson's conversion. On November 11, 2016, Jameson announced on her Twitter feed that she completed her conversion to Orthodox Judaism with a Haredi rabbinical court in Upstate New York.

On January 12, 2022, Jameson announced that she was suffering from Guillain–Barré syndrome.

Political views 
After viewing undercover videos of chicken production, Jameson agreed to do a short video for PETA as part of the group's campaign against KFC's treatment of chickens.

Jameson supported Hillary Clinton as the Democratic nominee in the 2008 United States presidential election, but Republican Mitt Romney in the 2012 United States presidential election, stating: "I'm very looking forward to a Republican being back in office. When you're rich, you want a Republican in office." In June 2015, she made a post on her Twitter account in support of same-sex marriage in the United States. In late November 2015, Jameson made multiple tweets showing support for Donald Trump as the next president of the United States.

In 2017, Jameson criticized Playboy for featuring Ines Rau, a transgender woman, as the November 2017 Playmate, calling it "...a foolish decision that alienates [Playboy's] consumer base."

Legal issues 
On April 26, 2010, Jameson's then-boyfriend Tito Ortiz was arrested for felony domestic abuse at the couple's Huntington Beach, California home. Jameson was photographed afterward that day with a bandaged arm, amid accusations by both parties against each other, with Ortiz accusing Jameson of being erratic and addicted to OxyContin, while she alleged that he was abusive. Since the incident occurred, both parties have recanted these allegations that were made toward one another, though as of April 29, 2010, the investigation by the police department remained open.

On May 25, 2012, Jameson was arrested in Westminster, California and charged with three misdemeanor counts for driving under the influence of alcohol or other drugs, driving with a blood-alcohol level over the state legal limit, and driving on a suspended license after her Range Rover struck a light pole. She initially pleaded not guilty to the charges, but later changed her plea to guilty. She was sentenced to three years of informal probation, ordered to pay $340 in fines, and participate in a Mothers Against Drunk Driving victims' impact panel. The charge for driving without a valid license was dismissed.

See also 

 List of pornographic actors who appeared in mainstream films

References

Works cited

External links 

 
 
 
 Profile on AVN
 Profile on Biography.com
 Jenna Jameson profile at Playboy.com

 
1974 births
20th-century American actresses
21st-century American actresses
21st-century American businesspeople
21st-century American women writers
American female erotic dancers
American female adult models
American pornographic film actresses
21st-century American memoirists
American pornographic film directors
Businesspeople from Nevada
The Dudley Brothers members
Women pornographic film directors
Living people
People from Paradise Valley, Arizona
Penthouse Pets
People from the Las Vegas Valley
Pornographic film actors from Nevada
People from Scottsdale, Arizona
American women memoirists
Writers from Nevada
Converts to Judaism from Roman Catholicism
American Orthodox Jews
Film directors from Arizona
Film directors from Nevada
21st-century American businesswomen